Daniel Clews (born 21 March 1980) is a British-born singer-songwriter from Sevenoaks, Kent, England.

Musical career
Clews spent years on the UK's live circuit before moving to Sweden and beginning collaborations with local artists which resulted in two releases with his backing band The Stars Above, one of which helped Clews secure a publishing deal with George Martin Music.

Clews's first solo album, Dan Clews, was released on 15 December 2009. The album received support from national and regional radio in the form of several spot plays on the Bob Harris Radio 2 show. The album received favourable reviews in the December 2009 issues of Mojo, Uncut Record Collector and The Guardian.

Clews recorded over 20 sessions for BBC regional radio stations and appeared on the Bob Harris Radio 2 show broadcast 10 July 2010.

Clews is a co-founder of "We teach Music", which provides private tuition and music workshops in Kent.

Discography
Dan Clews and the Stars Above
The Good Mile (2005)

Dan Clews
 Dan Clews (2009)
 Tourist in My Own Backyard (2014)
 While Middle England Mows Its Lawn (2017)

References

External links
 

Living people
English male singer-songwriters
People from Sevenoaks
Musicians from Kent
1980 births
21st-century English singers
21st-century British male singers